Edward Walsh (born August 18, 1951) is an American former professional ice hockey goaltender who played three games in the World Hockey Association for the Edmonton Oilers.

Early life 
Walsh was born in Somerville, Massachusetts. As a youth, he played in the 1963 and 1964 Quebec International Pee-Wee Hockey Tournaments with a minor ice hockey team from Boston. He later played goaltender for Boston University.

Career 
Waksh spent most of his career in the minors with the American Hockey League Nova Scotia Voyageurs, Rochester Americans and Springfield Indians.

Walsh played on the United States men's national ice hockey team at the 1974 and 1981 Ice Hockey World Championships and was invited to the team's training camp for the 1976 Canada Cup, although he did not make the final team.

Awards and honors

References

External links

Profile at Goaliesarchive.com

1951 births
Living people
AHCA Division I men's ice hockey All-Americans
American men's ice hockey goaltenders
Edmonton Oilers (WHA) players
Ice hockey players from Massachusetts
Nova Scotia Voyageurs players
Rochester Americans players
People from Arlington, Massachusetts
Sportspeople from Middlesex County, Massachusetts
Sportspeople from Somerville, Massachusetts
Springfield Indians players
NCAA men's ice hockey national champions